Raplamaa JK is an Estonian football club based in Rapla. Founded in 2015, they currently play in the II Liiga, the fourth tier of Estonian football.

Players

Current squad
 ''As of 2 August 2018.

Statistics

League and Cup

References

Football clubs in Estonia
Association football clubs established in 2015
Rapla